The People's Unity Assembly (Catalan: Assemblea d'Unitat Popular, AUP) was an independentist organisation and movement active between 1993 and 1996. The AUP was created by the Movement for Defence of the Land-IDP Faction (MDT-IDP), militants of La Crida, different local political organisations and independents. The AUP was close to the Republican Left of Catalonia (ERC). The AUP had the support of the mayors of Arbúcies and Sant Pere de Ribes.

History
The AUP was very active during its existence. The organisation made campaigns against the Spanish Constitution and in favor of independence. In 1995 the AUP supported, and went along, with the MDT-IDP in the municipal elections of that year, but at the same time the organisations was very close to thesis of ERC. In January 1996 a number of members of the AUP joined ERC and the organisation was dissolved. The opponents to that decision founded the Platform for the Unity of Action (PUA).

References

 Bassa, David. L'independentisme català, 1979-1994. Llibres de l'Índex, 1994
 Deulonder, Xavier. Història de l'MDT. Una organització independentista radical durant els anys 80 i 90. Barcelona, Llibres de l'Índex, 2005. (Neopàtria, 7) 

Political parties established in 1995
Socialist parties in Catalonia
Catalan independence movement